The endangered species of China may include any wildlife species designated for protection by the national government of China or listed as endangered by international organizations such as the  Convention on International Trade in Endangered Species of Wild Fauna and Flora (CITES) and the  International Union for Conservation of Nature (IUCN).

As one of the world's most biodiverse countries and its most populous, China is home to a significant number of wildlife species vulnerable to or in danger of local extinction due to the impact of human activity.  Under the Law of the People's Republic of China on the Protection of Wildlife, the national and local governments are required to designate rare or threatened species for special protection under the law.  The type of legal protection that a particular species in China enjoys may depend on the locality of administration.  For example, the Beijing Municipal Government designates the wild boar and masked palm civet, which are found in the wilderness around the municipality, as local Class I protected species even though none are among the Class I or II protected species designated by the national government.

China is a signatory country to the CITES and the national government's protected species list generally follows the designation of endangered species by CITES, but also includes certain species that are rare in the country but quite common in other parts of the world so as not to be considered globally threatened (such as moose and beaver) or are vulnerable to economic exploitation thus require legal protection (such as sable and otter).  The Chinese endangered species classifications are updated relatively infrequently, and a number of species deemed to be endangered by international bodies have not yet been so recognized in China. Many of the listed species are endemic to the country, such as the groove-toothed flying squirrel and the Ili pika.

Designation
The species listed in this article are designated by one or more of the following authorities as endangered or threatened:
 The List of Wildlife under Special State Protection as designated by the Chinese State Council pursuant to Article 9 of the Law of the People's Republic of China on the Protection of Wildlife
 The  Convention on International Trade in Endangered Species of Wild Fauna and Flora (CITES), in Appendix I of its catalogue includes "species threatened with extinction".
 The Red List of Threatened Species compiled by the International Union for Conservation of Nature.

Endangered and protected animal species

Mammals

Birds

Reptiles

Amphibians
{|class="wikitable collapsible"
!Protected and endangered amphibian species of China
|-
|style="padding:0; border:none; text-align:center; line-height:1.05"| indicates species endemic to China
{|class="wikitable sortable" style="text-align:center; line-height:1.05"
|-
! scope="col;"|Order
! scope="col;"|Family
! scope="col;"style="width:150px;"|Scientific name
! scope="col;"|Common name
! Chinese name
! scope="col;"style="width:30px;"|Protectionclassin China
! scope="col;"|IUCN Red List
! scope="col;"|CITES App'x
|-style="background: #bcffc5;"
|Caudata||Cryptobranchidae||Andrias davidianus||Chinese giant salamander||大鯢 ||II||02||I
|-style="background: #bcffc5;"
|Caudata||Hynobiidae||Hynobius chinensis||Chinese salamander||中国小鲵||||03||
|-style="background: #bcffc5;"
|Caudata||Hynobiidae||Batrachuperus londongensis||Longdong stream salamander||龙洞山溪鲵||||03||
|-style="background: #bcffc5;"
|Caudata||Hynobiidae||Hynobius amjiensis||Amji's salamander||安吉小鲵||||02||
|-style="background: #bcffc5;"
|Caudata||Hynobiidae||Hynobius formosanus||Taiwan salamander||台湾山椒鱼||||03||
|-style="background: #bcffc5;"
|Caudata||Hynobiidae||Hynobius sonani||Sonan's salamander||楚南小鲵||||03||
|-style="background: #bcffc5;"
|Caudata||Salamandridae||Paramesotriton guanxiensis||Guangxi warty newt||广西瘰螈||||03||
|-
|Caudata||Salamandridae||Ranodon sibiricus||Central Asian salamander||新疆北鲵||||03||
|-
|Caudata||Salamandridae||Tylototriton asperrimus||Black knobby newt||细痣疣螈||II||05||
|-style="background: #bcffc5;"
|Caudata||Salamandridae||Echinotriton chinhaiensis||Chinhai spiny newt||镇海疣螈||II||02||
|-style="background: #bcffc5;"
|Caudata||Salamandridae||Tylototriton kweichowensis||Red-tailed knobby newt||贵州疣螈||II||04||
|-style="background: #bcffc5;"
|Caudata||Salamandridae||Tylototriton taliangensis||Taliang knobby newt||大涼疣螈 ||II||05||
|-
|Caudata||Salamandridae||Tylototriton verrucosus||Himalayan newt||细瘰疣螈||II||06||
|-style="background: #bcffc5;"
|Caudata||Salamandridae||Tylototriton hainanensis||Hainan knobby newt||海南疣螈||||03||
|-style="background: #bcffc5;"
|Caudata||Salamandridae||Cynops orphicus||Dayang newt||汕头蝾螈||||03||
|-
|Caudata||Salamandridae||Echinotriton andersoni||Anderson's crocodile newt||琉球棘螈||||02||
|-style="background: #bcffc5;"
|Caudata||Salamandridae||Cynops wolterstorffi||Yunnan lake newt||滇池蝾螈||||07||
|-
|Anura||Ranidae||Hoplobatrachus tigerinus||Indus Valley bullfrog||虎紋蛙 ||II||06||
|-style="background: #bcffc5;"
|Anura||Ranidae||Amolops hainanensis||Hainan torrent frog||海南湍蛙||||02||
|-
|Anura||Ranidae||Amolops hongkongensis||Hong Kong cascade frog||香港瀑蛙||||03||
|-style="background: #bcffc5;"
|Anura||Ranidae||Glandirana minima||Fujian frog||小山蛙||||02||
|-style="background: #bcffc5;"
|Anura||Ranidae||Nanorana maculosa||Piebald spiny frog||花棘蛙||||03||
|-style="background: #bcffc5;"
|Anura||Ranidae||Rana chevronta||Chevron-spotted brown frog||峰斑林蛙||||02||
|-
|Anura||Ranidae||Nanorana unculuanus||Yunnan Asian frog||棘肛蛙||||03||
|-style="background: #bcffc5;"
|Anura||Ranidae||Rana sauteri||Sauter's brown frog||梭德氏蛙　||||03||
|-style="background: #bcffc5;"
|Anura||Ranidae||Nanorana yunnanensis||Yunnan spiny frog||双团棘胸蛙||||03||
|-style="background: #bcffc5;"
|Anura||Ranidae||Quasipaa boulengeri||Boulenger's spiny frog||西藏齿突蟾||||03||
|-style="background: #bcffc5;"
|Anura||Ranidae||Quasipaa robertingeri||Hejiang spiny frog||合江棘蛙||||03||
|-style="background: #bcffc5;"
|Anura||Ranidae||Odorrana kuangwuensis||Kwangwu odorous frog||光雾臭蛙||||02||
|-style="background: #bcffc5;"
|Anura||Ranidae||Pelophylax tenggerensis||none||腾格里蛙||||03||
|-
|Anura||Bufonidae||Parapelophryne scalpta||Hainan flathead toad||鳞皮厚蹼蟾||||
|-style="background: #bcffc5;"
|Anura||Microhylidae||Micryletta steinegeri||Stejneger's narrow-mouthed toad||台湾娟娃||||03||
|-style="background: #bcffc5;"
|Anura||Rhacophoridae||Liuixalus ocellatus||Ocellated bubble-nest frog||眼斑小树蛙||||03||
|-style="background: #bcffc5;"
|Anura||Rhacophoridae||Liuixalus romeri||Romer's tree frog||卢文氏树蛙||||03||
|-style="background: #bcffc5;"
|Anura||Rhacophoridae||Rhacophorus arvalis||Farmland green tree frog||诸罗树蛙||||03||
|-style="background: #bcffc5;"
|Anura||Rhacophoridae||Rhacophorus aurantiventris||Orange-belly tree frog||橙腹树蛙||||03||
|-style="background: #bcffc5;"
|Anura||Rhacophoridae||Rhacophorus minimus||none||||||03||
|-style="background: #bcffc5;"
|Anura||Rhacophoridae||Rhacophorus yaoshanensis||none||瑶山树蛙||||03||
|-style="background: #bcffc5;"
|Anura||Megophryidae||Leptobrachium boringii||Emei moustache toad||峨眉髭蟾||||03||
|-style="background: #bcffc5;"
|Anura||Megophryidae||Leptobrachium leishanense||Leishan spiny toad||雷山髭蟾||||03||
|-style="background: #bcffc5;"
|Anura||Megophryidae||Leptolalax alpinus||none||高山掌突蟾 ||||03||
|-style="background: #bcffc5;"
|Anura||Megophryidae||Oreolalax chuanbeiensis||Chuanbei toothed toad||川北齿蟾||||03||
|-style="background: #bcffc5;"
|Anura||Megophryidae||Oreolalax liangbeiensis||Liangbei toothed toad||凉北齿蟾||||02||
|-style="background: #bcffc5;"
|Anura||Megophryidae||Oreolalax omeimontis||Omei toothed toad||峨眉齿蟾||||03||
|-style="background: #bcffc5;"
|Anura||Megophryidae||Oreolalax pingii||Ping's toothed toad||秉志齿蟾||||03||
|-style="background: #bcffc5;"
|Anura||Megophryidae||Oreolalax puxiongensis||Puxiong toothed toad||普雄齿蟾||||03||
|-style="background: #bcffc5;"
|Anura||Megophryidae||Scutiger chintingensis||Chinting alpine toad||金顶齿突蟾||||03||
|-style="background: #bcffc5;"
|Anura||Megophryidae||Scutiger maculatus||Piebald alpine toad||花齿突蟾||||02||
|-style="background: #bcffc5;"
|Anura||Megophryidae||Scutiger muliensis||Muli cat-eyed toad||木里猫眼蟾||||03||
|-style="background: #bcffc5;"
|Anura||Megophryidae||Scutiger ningshanensis||Ningshan alpine toad||宁陕齿突蟾||||03||
|-style="background: #bcffc5;"
|Anura||Megophryidae||Scutiger pingwuensis||Pingwu alpine toad||平武齿突蟾||||03||
|-style="background: #bcffc5;"
|Anura||Megophryidae||Xenophrys brachykolos||Short-legged horned toad||短腳角蟾||||03||
|}
|}

Fish

Ray-finned fish (Actinopterygii)

 Cartilaginous fish (Chondrichthyes)

Lancelet

Endangered and protected plant species

Flora
Endangered and protected plant species, of the native and endemic .
 Abies beshanzuensis — Baishanzu fir, Baishan fir.
 Abies fabri — Faber's fir
 Abies fanjingshanensis Abies recurvata Abies yuanbaoshanensis Abies ziyuanensis Cupressus chengiana Cupressus duclouxiana — Chinese cypress
 Cupressus gigantea Disanthus cercidifolius var. longipes Fissistigma cupreonitens Fissistigma tungfangense Magnolia delavayi — Chinese evergreen magnolia
 Picea brachytyla Picea neoveitchii Pinus dabeshanensis Pseudolarix amabilis'' — golden larch

See also

Wildlife in China
Animal welfare and rights in China
Protected areas of China

Notes

References

E
.
China
China
.
.